The Salpêtriére School, also known as the School of Paris, is, with the Nancy School, one of the schools that contributed to the age of hypnosis in France from 1882 to 1892.  The leader of this school, the neurologist Jean Martin Charcot, contributed to the rehabilitation of hypnosis as a scientific subject presenting it as a somatic expression of hysteria.  Charcot also used hypnosis as an investigative method and that by putting his hysterical patients into an "experimental state" it would permit him to reproduce their symptoms and interpret them.

Charcot did not consider people suffering from hysteria as pretenders and discovered that hysteria was not just a state reserved for women.  Finally, Charcot associated hysteria to post-traumatic paralysis, establishing the basis for the theory of psychic trauma.

Charcot's collaborators included Joseph Babinski, Paul Richer, Alfred Binet, Charles Féré, Pierre Janet, Georges Gilles de la Tourette, Alexandre-Achille Souques, Jules Cotard, Pierre Marie, Gilbert Ballet, Paul Regnard, Désiré-Magloire Bourneville, Paul Brémaud and Victor Dumontpallier.

Ultimately, Charcot was accused of operating as a carnival showman, training his patients in theatrical behaviour, which he would attribute to hypnosis.  After his death in 1893, the practice of hypnotism declined in medical circles.

Historical context

Animal magnetism and the emergence of hypnosis

Since the theoretical development of animal magnetism in 1773 by Franz-Anton Mesmer, the various movements of "magnetic medicine" fought into vain to be recognized and legitimized. In France, animal magnetism is introduced by Mesmer in 1778 and is the subject of several official condemnations, particularly in 1784, and in 1842 the Academy of Sciences decided to stop investigating magnetic phenomenon. That did not prevent a great number of doctors from using  it, particularly in hospitals, including
Charles Deslon, Jules Cloquet, Alexandre Bertrand, Professor Husson, Leon Rostan, François Broussais, Étienne-Jean Georget, Didier Berna and Alphonse Teste. In other European countries, animal magnetism was not subject to such harsh judgment, and was practiced by doctors such David Ferdinand Koreff, Christoph Wilhelm Hufeland, Karl Alexander Ferdinand Kluge, Karl Christian Wolfart, Karl Schelling, Justinus Kerner, James Esdaile and John Elliotson.

The term "hypnotic" appears in  the Dictionary of the French Academy in 1814 and the terms "hypnotism", "hypnosis", "hypnoscope", "hypnopole", "hypnocratie", "hypnoscopy", "hypnomancie" and "hypnocritie" are proposed by Étienne Félix d'Henin de Cuvillers on the basis of the prefix "hypn" as of 1820. The Etymological dictionary of the French words drawn from the Greek, by Morin; second edition by Guinon, 2 volume – 8°, Paris, 1809, and the universal Dictionary of Boiste, include the expressions "hypnobate", "hypnology", "hypnologic", "hypnotic". But it is generally accepted that in the 1840s, it is that the Scottish surgeon James Braid who makes the transition between animal magnetism and hypnosis. In 1841, Braid attends a public demonstration of the hypnotizer Charles Lafontaine and in 1843 he publishes Neurhypnology, Treaty of nervous sleep or hypnotism. Braid's hypothesis essentially repeats the doctrines of the French imaginationnist hypnotizers such Jose Custodio da Faria and Alexandre Bertrand. Braid however criticizes  Bertrand for explaining the magnetic phenomenon as caused by a  mental state, the power of imagination, whereas he explains them as being due to a physiological cause, the tiredness of the nerve centers related to a paralysis of the ocular apparatus.

His contribution consists above all of proposing a new method of fascination based on concentrating  on a brilliant object, a  method that supposedly produces more constant and more rapid effects compared to that of the old-fashioned hypnotizers, and a theory based on the concept of mental fatigue. For him, hypnosis is a state of mental concentration during which the faculties of the patient's spirit are so entirely monopolized by one idea that it becomes indifferent to any other considerations or influence. Braid uses this method as an anesthetic during surgery. At that time, ether was not yet used in anesthesiology. Discovered in 1818 by Michael Faraday, ether is not used for the first time until 1846, by the American dentist William Morton.

Around 1848, Ambroise-Auguste Liébeault, a young surgery intern, also became interested in animal magnetism. Influenced by the hypnotizers Charles Lafontaine and Jules Dupotet de Sennevoy, he began putting young women to sleep.
On December 5, 1859, the surgeon Alfred Velpeau presented to Academy of Sciences  an intervention practised under hypnotic anaesthesia according to the method of Braid in the name of three young doctors, Étienne Eugène Azam, Paul Broca and Eugene Follin. The previous day at Necker hospital the three operated on an anal tumor using hypnotic anaesthesia. The operation, very painful by nature, occurred without the patient showing any sign of pain. The following year, Joseph Durand (de Gros) published A theoretical and practical course of Braidisme, or nervous hypnotism.

In 1864, Liébeault moved to  Nancy as a philanthropist healer, curing children with magnetized water and by the laying on of hands. His  interest in animal magnetism was revived by reading the works of Crêpe and Azam. He is on the fringe at a time when animal magnetism was completely discredited by the academy when he publishes in 1866, to general indifference, Sleep and similar states considered especially from the point of view of the action of the moral on the physique.

In 1870, the philosopher Hippolyte Taine presented  an introduction to the theories of Braid in his review Intelligence. In 1880, a neurologist of Breslau, Rudolf Heidenhain, impressed by the achievements of the public hypnotizer Carl Hansen, adopts his method and publishes a book on animal magnetism. In Austria, the neurologist Moritz Benedikt experiments with hypnosis, followed by the doctor Josef Breuer.

References

Hypnosis organizations
Medical and health organizations based in France
Mental health in France